Angamaly Church may refer to:
 St. George Syro-Malabar Catholic Basillica, Angamaly
 St. Mary's Jacobite Soonoro Cathedral, Angamaly
 Mar Hormizd Syro-Malabar Catholic Co-cathedral, Angamaly